Jaranwala–Lyallpur Branch Line  (in Urdu  جڑانوالہ-لائلپور ریلوے لائن ) was the one railway branch line constructed in 1926 from Jaranwala railway station to Lyallpur Faisalabad railway station 22 miles (35 km) 

The branch line was uprooted in 1940 due to steel shortage in World War II.

Stations
 Jaranwala
 Jhakka Ladhana
 Muhammadwala Railway station
 Faisalabad

References

Transport in Faisalabad District
1926 establishments in India
1940 disestablishments in India
Railway lines opened in 1926
Railway lines closed in 1940
Closed railway lines in Pakistan